Shake rag or Shakerag may refer to:

A cloth held out as a signal for example to stop a train
An unkempt and disreputable person  (archaic usage) according to Miriam Webster Dictionary. Similar to a tatterdemalion
Shake Rag, Georgia
Shake Rag, Mississippi
Shakerag, formerly Sheltonville, a community in Johns Creek, Georgia
Shakerag or Shake Rag, a neighborhood in Bowling Green, Kentucky that is now home to the Shake Rag Historic District
Shakerag, a racetrack and early name for the surrounding area of what is now part of Melrose, Florida
Shake Rag, a historically African American community in Tupelo, Mississippi east of the old M&O (later GM&O) railway tracks and north from Main Street